The Court Church in Ćipur is a Serbian Orthodox church located in the Ćipur neighborhood of Cetinje, Montenegro.

The church is dedicated to the Birth of the Most Holy Mother of God and is located on the historical site of Ćipur in the historical core of Cetinje, the former capital of the Kingdom of Montenegro. It was built by King Nikola I of Montenegro in 1890, on the place where there used to be a monastery that Ivan Crnojević built in the 15th century dedicated to the Mother of God.

The church was declared a cultural heritage monument in 1961, and in 2012 it became part of the History Museum of Montenegro. As a monumental unit, together with the archeological remains of the monastery complex of the Crnojević noble family, it is a World Heritage Site candidate.

The remains of Ivan Crnojević, King Nikola, Queen Milena and Montenegrin princesses Ksenija and Vjera are interred in the church.

See also
 Cetinje Monastery

References

Cetinje
Petrović-Njegoš dynasty
Serbian Orthodox church buildings in Montenegro
Tourist attractions in Montenegro
Rebuilt buildings and structures in Montenegro
Church buildings with domes
Burial sites of the Petrović-Njegoš dynasty